Tamato Samasoni Leupolu (born 7 December 1980 in Auckland) is a New Zealand-born Samoan rugby union player. He plays as a prop.

Career
His first international cap for the Manu Samoa was against Ireland, at Lansdowne Road, on 11 November 2001. He was part of the 2003 Rugby World Cup roster, where he played against South Africa, at Brisbane. His last cap was against Japan, at Miyagi, on 16 June 2007.

External links

Tamato Samasoni Leupolu at New Zealand Rugby History

1980 births
Living people
Rugby union players from Auckland
Samoan rugby union players
Rugby union props
Samoa international rugby union players
New Zealand sportspeople of Samoan descent
Samoan expatriate sportspeople in France
Stade Rochelais players
RC Orléans players
CA Brive players
Union Bordeaux Bègles players
Expatriate rugby union players in France
Samoan expatriate rugby union players
New Zealand expatriate sportspeople in France
New Zealand expatriate rugby union players
Auckland rugby union players